Herman Venter (born 25 August 1975) is a South African cricketer. He played in one first-class match for Boland in 2007.

See also
 List of Boland representative cricketers

References

External links
 

1975 births
Living people
South African cricketers
Boland cricketers
People from Roodepoort